MD 88 may refer to:
Maryland Route 88, a state highway
McDonnell Douglas MD-88,  an airplane